The 1992 South African motorcycle Grand Prix was the last round of the 1992 Grand Prix motorcycle racing season. It took place on the weekend of 4–6 September 1992 at Kyalami.

500 cc race
Eddie Lawson announced his retirement. To win the championship, Wayne Rainey had to finish in front of Mick Doohan and higher than 3rd if Doohan was directly behind. According to Scott, Kenny Roberts asked Rainey if he wanted John Kocinski's "help", and Rainey said no.

Kocinski on pole. Rainey gets the start from Kocinski, Doohan and Kevin Schwantz.

Doug Chandler moved into 3rd, Schwantz 4th, Doohan 5th.

Chandler makes it a 3-way fight for first with Rainey and teammate Kocinski.

Kocinski through to 1st, Wayne Gardner and Schwantz in a battle for 4th.

Kocinski gets a gap from Rainey, then it's a small gap to Gardner and Chandler.

Gardner closes on Rainey and passes into 2nd place. Gardner would much rather Rainey get the championship than Doohan, "so for once [Gardner] gave [Rainey] a whole lot of room as he went by."

Rainey's 3rd place is enough to win the championship by 4 points. Kocinski goes to Suzuki 250 GP next year, then is fired and goes to Cagiva.

500 cc classification

250 cc classification

References

South African motorcycle Grand Prix
South African
Motorcycle
September 1992 sports events in Africa